The North Central Colorado Urban Area comprises the four contiguous metropolitan statistical areas in the north central region of the State of Colorado: the Denver–Aurora Metropolitan Statistical Area, the Boulder Metropolitan Statistical Area, the Fort Collins-Loveland Metropolitan Statistical Area, and the Greeley Metropolitan Statistical Area. With the exception of southeastern Elbert County, southeastern Park County,  and tiny portions of southern Douglas County, the entire North Central Colorado Urban Area is drained by the South Platte River and its tributaries.  The North Central Colorado Urban Area is the central, and the most populous, of the three primary subregions of the Front Range Urban Corridor.

The North Central Colorado Urban Area had a population of 3,390,504 at the 2010 United States Census, a 17.67% increase from the 2000 United States Census.  In 2010, 67.42% of Coloradans lived in the North Central Colorado Urban Area.

Extent

Constituent jurisdictions
The North Central Colorado Urban Area comprises:

See also

Colorado
Outline of Colorado
Index of Colorado-related articles
Bibliography of Colorado
Colorado statistical areas
Front Range Urban Corridor
North Central Colorado Urban Area
South Central Colorado Urban Area
Geography of Colorado
History of Colorado
List of counties in Colorado
List of places in Colorado
List of census-designated places in Colorado
List of forts in Colorado
List of ghost towns in Colorado
List of mountain passes in Colorado
List of mountain peaks of Colorado
List of municipalities in Colorado
List of adjectivals and demonyms for Colorado cities
List of city nicknames in Colorado
List of post offices in Colorado
Protected areas of Colorado

References

External links

Colorado state government website
Colorado tourism website
History Colorado website

Metropolitan areas of Colorado